The King Armored Car was manufactured by the Armored Motor Car Company (AMC). It was the first American armored vehicle, and was ordered by the United States Marine Corps in 1915 for testing before being used by the 1st Armored Car Squadron, which consisted of eight cars. The 1st Armored Car Squadron was the USA's first formal armored unit.

Description
The car had one Lewis Machine Gun (M1895 Colt–Browning on earlier models) mounted in an armored turret to protect the gunner from small arms fire. It was designed to be quite easy to transport. It could be taken ashore whole or it could be broken down into smaller pieces to put into motor launches, taken ashore, and reassembled on the beach. However, it could not be considered an unqualified success, as it was not very reliable. This problem was compounded by a lack of qualified mechanics, and replacement parts were few and far between.

Service
The 1st Armored Car Squadron did not see any action during World War I. During World War I, General Pershing refused USMC Commandant George Barnett's offer of a Marine division. Had General Pershing accepted General Barnett's offer, it is highly probable that the 1st Armored Car Squadron would have been sent along with it. The 1st Armored Car Squadron was disbanded in 1921. Five of the vehicles were used in Haiti and Santo Domingo until 1927, and all of the cars were finally disposed of in 1934

Units
 USMC 1st Armored Car Squadron

References
Notes

Sources
Kenneth W. Estes. Marines under armor: the Marine Corps and the armored fighting vehicle, 1916-2000. Library of Naval Biography. Naval Institute Press, 2000. , . Pg 3

External links
 Quantico King Armored Car pictures

World War I armoured cars
Armoured cars of the United States
Military vehicles introduced in the 1910s
Vehicles introduced in 1915